The 2007 NORCECA Beach Volleyball Circuit at Boca Chica was held from April 6 to 8 2007 in Boca Chica, Dominican Republic. It was the first leg of the NORCECA Beach Volleyball Circuit 2007.

Women's competition

Men's competition

References
 Norceca
 Volley Canada (Archived 2009-05-16)
 BV Database (Archived 2009-05-16)

Santo Domingo
North America
Beach
International volleyball competitions hosted by the Dominican Republic